Coney Island Baby is the sixth solo studio album by American musician Lou Reed, released December 1975 in the US, and in January 1976 in the UK, by RCA Records.

Music and lyrics 

The album has been described by Anthony DeCurtis as "perhaps the most romantic album of Reed's career". Many of the album's songs were inspired by and dedicated to Reed's girlfriend and muse at the time, Rachel Humphreys. According to Aidan Levy, Coney Island Baby was "as much a love letter to Rachel as it was to the nostalgic Coney Island of the mind." 

The album's title track directly references Rachel with the line: "I'd like to send this one out to Lou and Rachel, and all the kids at P.S. 192." "P.S. 192" refers to P.S. 192 – which at that time was a public school for kindergarten to 6th grade, in Brooklyn, New York City, NY, where Reed went to school before moving to Long Island, New York. In 1979 Reed said "Saying 'I'm a Coney Island baby' at the end of that song is like saying I haven't backed off an inch. And don't you forget it." It is a direct continuation of the poem "The Coach and Glory of Love", written by Reed and published in the Fall 1971 edition of The Harvard Advocate.

The album includes the song "She's My Best Friend", a version of which was originally recorded by Reed's band the Velvet Underground in 1969, and eventually released on the 1985 compilation album VU. The 30th-anniversary re-issue of Coney Island Baby includes bonus tracks featuring Reed's Velvet Underground bandmate Doug Yule.

Critical reception 

Reviewing for Rolling Stone in 1976, Paul Nelson wrote, "For the eight superb songs on Coney Island Baby, Reed assembled the best band he has performed with since the Velvet Underground. Michael Suchorsky's versatile, controlled drumming is especially praiseworthy, and Reed himself has even managed to rekindle his intense, individualistic guitar playing of the late Sixties. Better yet, he has shelved his recent FM-DJ vocal style in favor of confident, expressive singing. The songs themselves—as structured and melodic as any Reed has written — are timeless, terrific rock & roll, and the strength of the genre is accentuated by the simplicity and logic of crisp, tactile production (by Reed and Godfrey Diamond) and careful, resourceful arrangements which emphasize both electric and acoustic guitars and inventive background vocals."

In Christgau's Record Guide: Rock Albums of the Seventies (1981), Robert Christgau said of the record, "At first it's gratifying to ascertain that he's trying harder, but very soon that old cheapjack ennui begins to poke through. Oddly, though, most of the cheap stuff is near the surface—the songs sound warmer when you listen close. And not even in his most lyrical moments with the Velvets has he let his soft side show as nakedly as it does on the title cut."

For the entry on Reed in Rock: The Rough Guide (1996), Roy Edroso highlighted Coney Island Baby as "the most pleasing of Reed's soft-rock albums" and said, "His sense of humour has never been better than on 'A Gift', and the title track reminds you why Jonathan Richman idolized Reed: who else would have had the nerve to try to find 'the glory of love' in the reveries of a troubled would-be high-school football player (in doo-wop style, no less)?".

Track listing 
All tracks are written by Lou Reed.

Side one
"Crazy Feeling"  – 2:56
"Charley's Girl"  – 2:36
"She's My Best Friend"  – 6:00
"Kicks"  – 6:06

Side two
"A Gift"  – 3:47
"Ooohhh Baby"  – 3:45
"Nobody's Business"  – 3:41
"Coney Island Baby"  – 6:36

30th anniversary deluxe edition bonus tracks
 "Nowhere at All" – 3:17 recorded November 18 & 21, 1975 at Mediasound Studios, NYC
 "Downtown Dirt" – 4:18 recorded January 3 & 4, 1975 at Electric Lady Studios, NYC
 "Leave Me Alone" – 5:35 recorded October 19 & 20, 1975 at Mediasound Studios, NYC
 "Crazy Feeling" – 2:39 recorded January 3 & 4, 1975 at Electric Lady Studios, NYC
 "She's My Best Friend" – 4:08 recorded January 4, 1975 at Electric Lady Studios, NYC
 "Coney Island Baby" – 5:41 recorded January 6, 1975 at Electric Lady Studios, NYC

Personnel
Musicians
 Lou Reed – vocals, rhythm guitar, piano
 Bob Kulick – lead guitar, slide guitar
 Bruce Yaw – bass guitar
 Michael Suchorsky – drums, percussion
 Joanne Vent, Michael Wendroff, Godfrey Diamond – backing vocals
 Doug Yule – bass guitar on bonus tracks 2, 4–6, guitar on bonus tracks 4–6
 Bob Meday – drums on bonus tracks 2, 4–6
 Michael Fonfara – keyboards on bonus tracks 2, 4–6

Production and artwork
 Geoffrey Diamond, Lou Reed, Michael Wendroff – mixing
 José Rodriguez – recording
 Acy Lehman – art direction
 Mick Rock – photography

Charts

References

  Mentions the Catalano/Alonzo song.

1976 albums
Lou Reed albums
RCA Records albums
Albums produced by Lou Reed
Albums recorded at Electric Lady Studios
Albums with cover art by Mick Rock
Transgender-related music
LGBT-related albums